The following streetcar lines once operated on Long Island, New York in Queens, Nassau, and Suffolk Counties. Many of these systems were owned by the Long Island Consolidated Electrical Companies, a holding company partially owned by the Long Island Rail Road, and Interborough Rapid Transit Company between March 30, 1905 and July 18, 1935.

Babylon Railroad
The Babylon Railroad Company began in 1870 as a horse-drawn trolley from the South Side Railroad's Babylon Station to the Fire Island Ferry.  After the Central Railroad of Long Island opened in 1873 passengers could access the horse car to the Great South Bay at the Watson House.  A second line was opened from Babylon Station into Amityville in 1910.

Cedarhurst Railway
The Cedarhurst Railway Company ran a line from Woodmere (LIRR station) to Brosewere Bay where the Rockaway Hunt Club and Rockaway Steeplechase Association were located.

Echo Line Railroad
The Echo Line was a trolley line that ran from Port Jefferson Harbor to Port Jefferson (LIRR station) in what was then the Hamlet of Echo, New York. It was acquired by the Suffolk Traction Company to be merged into the main trolley line to Patchogue, but collapsed along with the rest of Suffolk Traction Company.

Freeport Railroad Company
The Freeport Railroad Company owned and operated a year-round trolley route in Freeport, New York, and leased from the connecting Great South Bay Ferry Company that portion of the latter’s route between Front Street and Ellison’s dock. The Freeport Railroad Company and the Great South Bay Ferry Company were commonly controlled. Service was inaugurated on August 5, 1913. Service ended on or about November 8, 1917, and on July 13, 1918, the trolley route was sold to the Great South Bay Ferry Company.

Garden City Shuttle
In the early-20th Century, the Long Island Rail Road installed a trolley line that ran along the former CRRLI Main Line between Garden City Station and Plainedge from 1915 to 1933. A connection to Country Life Press station was established in 1927. Trolleys were replaced by MP41's and later MP54's.

Glen Cove Railroad
The Glen Cove Railroad was one of two trolley lines that ran from the Sea Cliff Railroad Station. The route was north in private right of way alongside the LIRR to Glen Street station and from there in streets on a circuitous route through the City of Glen Cove. The line existed between  1905 and November 15, 1924.

Great South Bay Ferry Company
The Great South Bay Ferry Company operated a summer-only trolley route in Freeport, New York, connecting with its ferries to and from Point Lookout, New York. Its route was initially owned by the Long Beach Transportation Company which was then leased to the Great South Bay Ferry Company for operation. Service was inaugurated on May 27, 1905, between Atlantic Avenue and Front Street; from May 26, 1906, service was extended to operate the full route between Atlantic Avenue and Ellison’s dock on Little Swift Creek. On or about March 4, 1907, the ferry company became a subsidiary of a holding company, the newly-incorporated Seashore Municipal Railroad Company. On September 27, 1907, the Long Beach Transportation Company was merged into the Great South Bay Ferry Company; thereafter the ferry company was the owner of the trolley route. The larger ambitions of the Seashore Municipal Railroad Company were not realized, and by 1913 it was practically defunct. The southern portion of the route, between Front Street and Ellison’s dock, was leased to the Freeport Railroad Company in 1913. The Great South Bay Ferry Company and the Freeport Railroad Company were commonly controlled. On July 13, 1918, the trolley route of the Freeport Railroad Company was purchased and became part of the ferry company’s summer-only trolley operations. Service probably ended on or about September 30, 1921.

Huntington Railroad
The Huntington Railroad was established on July 19, 1890 with a trolley line between Huntington Village and Halesite. It was eventually extended to Huntington Railroad Station, then along what is today mostly NY 110 through Melville, Farmingdale, and as far south as the docks of Amityville.

Huntington Traction Company
The Huntington Traction Company was the successor to the Huntington Railroad Company inheriting the original line between Huntington Railroad Station and Halesite. The company ran the line only as far south as Jericho Turnpike until it was finally abandoned in 1927.

Nassau County Railway
The Nassau County Railway ran from the Sea Cliff Railroad Station through the  Village of Sea Cliff to the top of the "cable road"  incline that went down to the dock. The trolley was in operation from July 2, 1902 to December 31, 1924.

New York and Long Island Traction
The New York and Long Island Traction Company operated east to Freeport, Hempstead, and Mineola in Nassau County.

New York and North Shore Traction
The New York and North Shore Traction Company operated from northeastern Queens east into Nassau County. It was established in 1902 and was originally known as the "Mineola Roslyn & Port Washington Traction Company," then renamed 1907.

Northport Traction Company
The Northport Traction Company operated from the Northport East Railroad Station into downtown Northport Village.

South Shore Traction Company
The South Shore Traction Company was based in Sayville, New York. It had plans to expand into Patchogue and north through Bohemia, Lake Ronkonkoma, St. James and Stony Brook towards Port Jefferson, not to mention through Nassau and Queens County. However, because it was unable to break through the monopoly of the LIRR-held lines in Nassau County, it sold off its two original  lines to the Suffolk Traction Company.

Suffolk Traction Company
The Suffolk Traction Company operated between Patchogue, Canaan Lake, and Holtsville in Suffolk County. It also had lines to Medford, Blue Point, Bayport, and even a connection to Sayville. The Sayville, and Bayport-Blue Point Lines were originally owned by the South Shore Traction Company. Plans to extend the main trolley to Port Jefferson failed, even as a bridge was being built over the LIRR Main Line. Another extension that was never built included a line towards Bellport and Brookhaven.

See also

List of streetcar lines in Queens
List of streetcar lines in Brooklyn

References

Images of Rail: Lost Trolleys of Queens and Long Island, by Stephen L. Meyers(2006).

External links
 All of Long Island
 A Desire Named Streetcar, by Sylvia Adcock (Newsday—Long Island; Our Story)
 Long Island Transit and LI Trolley Map (Chicago Transit & Railfan Website)
 Pennsylvania Railroad Company Discontinuance/Last Runs of Passenger Service (Railroad – Ferry – Steamboat – Trolley – Rapid Transit) by Line Segment (June 30, 2003)
 Huntington
 Huntington Railroad (Unofficial LIRR History Website)
 Amityville-Halesite Trolley (Long Island Oddities)
 Northport
 Northport Traction Company (Unofficial LIRR History Website)
 Northport Traction (Arrt's Arrchives)
 Northport Traction Company (Long Island Oddities)
 Nassau and Queens
 Map of the borough of Queens and vicinity (Map Collections)
 Sayville-Patchouge-Holbrook
 Suffolk Traction Company (Long Island Oddities)
 TrainsAreFun.com
 Suffolk Traction Company
 1915 image in Patchogue
 Suffolk
  Patchogue-Medford Library Local History Department.

 
Railroads on Long Island
Defunct public transport operators in the United States
Lon
Streetcar lines